Grand Barachois is a large natural lagoon in Saint Pierre and Miquelon. It lies immediately south of Miquelon Island, and is formed largely by the 12 kilometre-long tombolo of La Dune.

See also
Barachois

Landforms of Saint Pierre and Miquelon
Miquelon-Langlade
Lagoons of North America